Jan Zrzavý (5 November 1890 – 12 October 1977) was a leading Czech painter, graphic artist and illustrator of the 20th century.

Biography
He was born in Vadín in Bohemia, today a part of Okrouhlice near Havlíčkův Brod in the Czech Republic. He studied privately in Prague and then attended the UMPRUM there for 2 years starting in 1907, before being expelled. He first visited France in 1907, returning to Paris and Brittany frequently until 1939, but maintaining close links to his homeland. 

After the war he became an associate professor at Palacký University of Olomouc from 1947 to 1950. Later he maintained private studios in Prague and Okrouhlice. He grew increasingly recognized on a national and international level in the 1950s and 1960s, and was honoured a title of a National Artist in 1965. He died in Prague on October 12, 1977.

Artistic influences
Zrzavý was a key member of the Czech, and more broadly European, modernism movement the early part of the 20th century. Although he is regarded as a symbolist he was heavily influenced by European Medieval art. Throughout his life he was also inspired by spectacular landscapes, both abroad (France, Italy, and Greece) as well as in his native country (Vodňany, Okrouhlice, Prague). He reworked many of his themes multiple times. He was admired by and written about by one of the founders of the Czech artistic movement called Poetism, Karel Teige.

His œuvre dedicated to the Czech National Gallery is on display in the town of Telč and in Prague.

Art groups and clubs
Sursum, 1910 – founder
SVU Manes 1917 – member
Tvrdošíjní (Stubborns) – co-founder

External links

Detailed biography (in Czech)
Detailed biography with pictures (in English)
Detailed biography with pictures (in Czech)
Detailed biography with pictures (in German)

1890 births
1977 deaths
People from Havlíčkův Brod District
Czech painters
Czech male painters
Czech scenic designers
Modern painters